Germany competed at the 1952 Summer Olympics in Helsinki, Finland. 205 competitors, 173 men and 32 women, took part in 123 events in 18 sports.

Germany had not been invited to the 1948 Summer Olympics in London, Great Britain because of their role in World War II, and because their NOC restored in 1947 did not represent a recognized state yet, which was founded in 1949. Germany took part in the 1952 Winter Olympics, with the GDR declining to cooperate in a single team Germany as required by the IOC, joining only in 1956 and later. On the other hand, the French-occupied Saar protectorate had to send a separate team, but could join for 1956.

While the first-ever (and only) failure to score Gold in Summer Games was disappointing, resulting in a 28th rank, the number of total medals ranked fifth.

Medalists

Athletics

Boxing

Canoeing

Cycling

Road Competition
Men's Individual Road Race (190.4 km)
Edi Ziegler — 5:07:47.5 (→  Bronze Medal)
Oskar Zeissner — 5:11:18.5 (→ 8th place)
Paul Maue — 5:24:44.5 (→ 48th place)
Walter Becker — did not finish (→ no ranking)

Track Competition
Men's 1.000m Sprint Scratch Race
Werner Potzernheim —  Bronze Medal

Diving

Men's 3m Springboard
Hans Aderhold
 Preliminary Round — 67.09 points (→ 11th place)

Werner Sobeck
 Preliminary Round — 66.75 points (→ 12th place)

Equestrian

Fencing

Nine fencers, eight men and one woman, represented Germany in 1952.

Men's foil
 Norman Casmir
 Kurt Wahl
 Julius Eisenecker

Men's team foil
 Willy Fascher, Kurt Wahl, Norman Casmir, Julius Eisenecker, Siegfried Rossner

Men's épée
 Erwin Kroggel

Men's sabre
 Willy Fascher
 Hans Esser
 Richard Liebscher

Men's team sabre
 Siegfried Rossner, Willy Fascher, Hans Esser, Richard Liebscher

Women's foil
 Lilo Allgayer

Football

Gymnastics

Hockey

Modern pentathlon

Three male pentathletes represented Germany in 1952.

Individual
 Berthold Slupik
 Dietloff Kapp
 Adolf Harder

Team
 Berthold Slupik
 Dietloff Kapp
 Adolf Harder

Rowing

Germany had 21 male rowers participate in five out of seven rowing events in 1952.

 Men's double sculls
 Waldemar Beck
 Gerhard Füßmann

 Men's coxless pair
 Heinz Renneberg
 Heinz Eichholz

 Men's coxed pair
 Heinz Manchen
 Helmut Heinhold
 Helmut Noll (cox)

 Men's coxed four
 Günter Twiesselmann
 Klaus Schulze
 Heinz Beyer
 Gerd Vogeley
 Hans Joachim Wiemken (cox)

 Men's eight
 Anton Reinartz
 Michael Reinartz
 Roland Freihoff
 Heinz Zünkler
 Peter Betz
 Stefan Reinartz
 Hans Betz
 Toni Siebenhaar
 Hermann Zander (cox)

Sailing

Shooting

Six shooters represented Germany in 1952.

25 m pistol
 Ludwig Leupold
 Paul Wehner

50 m pistol
 Fritz Krempel

50 m rifle, three positions
 Erich Spörer
 Albert Sigl

50 m rifle, prone
 Erich Spörer
 Albert Sigl

Trap
 Kurt Schöbel

Water polo

Weightlifting

Wrestling

Men's flyweight
Heini Weber

Men's bantamweight
Ferdinand Schmitz

Men's featherweight
Rolf Ellerbrock

Men's lightweight
Heini Nettesheim

Men's welterweight
Anton Mackowiak

Men's middleweight
Gustav Gocke

Men's light-heavyweight
Max Leichter

Men's heavyweight
Willi Waltner

References

External links
Official Olympic Reports
Official Medal table
International Olympic Committee results database

Nations at the 1952 Summer Olympics
1952
Summer Olympics